Lincoln is an unincorporated community and census-designated place (CDP) in Lewis and Clark County, Montana, United States. As of the 2010 census, the population was 1,013.

History
Meriwether Lewis passed through the area on his return to St. Louis in 1806, following the famous "River of the Road to the Buffalo" created by Native Americans centuries before. Gold discoveries in the mid-1860s brought miners to a number of camps in the area, and Lincoln was eventually created when nearby Lincoln Gulch was abandoned in favor of the town's present location. Recreational, logging and mining activities along the Blackfoot River in the early 20th century made it a convenient commercial center. Nearby wilderness areas continue to attract visitors and residents.

The Lincoln Community Hall (1918) and the Hotel Lincoln (1914) are listed on the National Register of Historical Places.

"Unabomber" arrest

The bombing campaign resulted in three deaths and 23 wounded. Kaczynski is currently serving eight life sentences without the possibility of parole at FMC Butner Prison in North Carolina.

2017 earthquake
The earthquake originated from a depth of nearly  underground, near a fault system known as the Lewis and Clark line, which runs  from northern Idaho to east of Helena, Montana. It was the eighth-strongest earthquake recorded in Montana. There were at least nine more tremors nearby within the first hour after the earthquake, with magnitudes between 3.1 and 4.9.

Geography and climate
Lincoln is located in western Lewis and Clark County at  (46.957713, -112.672178).

Lincoln is located on Montana Highway 200, the longest route signed as a state highway in the United States, running  from Idaho to North Dakota. From Lincoln, the highway runs northeast up and over the Continental Divide  to Great Falls and west  to Missoula.

Lincoln has a humid continental climate (Dfb) bordering closely on a subarctic climate (Dfc). Summers are warm to hot while winters are cold and snowy, with annual average snowfall totaling 85.4 inches (217 cm).

Lincoln has a humid continental climate bordering on semi-arid. Snow is usually dry powder, although strong Pacific Ocean storms sometimes bring moisture-laden snow to the area.

Demographics

As of the census of 2010, there were 1,013 people, 507 households, and 296 families residing in the CDP. The population density was 56.6 people per square mile (21.8/km2). There were 846 housing units at an average density of 47.3 per square mile (18.2/km2). The racial makeup of the CDP was 95.5% White, 2.2% Native American, 0.2% Asian, and 1.9% from two or more races. Hispanic or Latino of any race were 1.5% of the population.

There were 507 households, out of which 16.6% had children under the age of 18 living with them, 48.3% were married couples living together, 6.7% had a female householder with no husband present, and 41.6% were non-families. 18.5% of all households were made up of individuals, and 33.9% had someone living alone who was 65 years of age or older. The average household size was 2.00 and the average family size was 2.55.

In the CDP, the population was spread out, with 16.3% under the age of 18, 3.7% from 18 to 24, 16.1% from 25 to 44, 41.2% from 45 to 64, and 22.8% who were 65 years of age or older. The median age was 53 years. For every 100 females, there were 108.4 males. For every 100 females age 18 and over, there were 107.3 males.

The median income for a household in the CDP was $26,688, and the median income for a family was $32,784. Males had a median income of $24,583 versus $15,227 for females. The per capita income for the CDP was $14,243. About 17.4% of families and 21.2% of the population were below the poverty line, including 28.8% of those under age 18 and 9.8% of those age 65 or over.

Infrastructure
Lincoln Airport is a public use airport located two miles (4 km) east of town.

Education
Public education in Lincoln is administered by Lincoln Public School District #38. They educate students from kindergarten to 12th grade. Lincoln High School's team name is the Lynx.

Lincoln has a public library, a branch of the Lewis & Clark Library.

In popular culture
Nearby Bugle Mountain (also known as "Bugle Peak"), located in the Scapegoat Wilderness, was the setting of a forest fire in the fictional 1952 motion picture Red Skies of Montana. The film, based in part on the tragic 1949 Mann Gulch fire, was filmed in Montana.

Notable people
 Doug Swingley, four-time winner of the Iditarod Trail Sled Dog Race
 Ted Kaczynski, aka "Unabomber"

See also

 List of census-designated places in Montana

References

External links

 Blackfoot Valley Dispatch, local newspaper
 Lincoln schools

Census-designated places in Lewis and Clark County, Montana
Census-designated places in Montana
Helena, Montana micropolitan area